This is a list of the national parks in the Baltic states of Estonia, Latvia, and Lithuania.

Estonia

There are 6 national parks in Estonia.

Latvia

There are 4 national parks in Latvia.

Lithuania 

There are 5 national parks in Lithuania. They were established in 1991 after Lithuania declared independence from the Soviet Union in 1990. Lithuanian SSR National Park established in 1974 was reorganized and renamed Aukštaitija National Park. Now they cover about 2.3 percent of Lithuania's territory.

See also
 Geography of Estonia
 Geography of Latvia
 Geography of Lithuania
 Protected areas of Estonia
 List of protected areas of Latvia
 List of protected areas of Lithuania

References

Baltics
 
 
 
Baltic states-related lists
Estonia geography-related lists
Latvia geography-related lists
Lithuania geography-related lists